Eshaq Jahangiri Kouhshahi (born 21 January 1958) is an Iranian politician who served as the sixth first vice president from 2013 until 2021 in Hassan Rouhani's government. Jahangiri was the minister of industries and mines from 1997 to 2005 under President Mohammad Khatami. Before that, he was the governor of Isfahan Province. He was also a member of Parliament for two terms.

Early life and education
Jahangiri was born on 21 January 1958 in Sirjan County, Kerman Province. He was given the nickname "Eshaq Damaq" as a kid, meaning Eshaq the big nose. He graduated from University of Kerman with a degree in physics. He was active in revolutionary groups prior to the Iranian Revolution and once was wounded by the forces of the Shah Mohammad Reza Pahlavi. He later received a PhD from Islamic Azad University, Science and Research Branch, Tehran in industrial management. He is married to Manijeh Jahangiri and has four children, Hossein, Hesam, Faezeh and Hoda.

Political career

Jahangiri began his political career following the Iranian revolution. He became deputy head of the agriculture department in Kerman in July 1980. Then, he was appointed its head in 1982. He was elected to the Iranian Parliament in 1984 election. He was also reelected in next election. He was appointed governor of Isfahan on 1 September 1992 by Akbar Hashemi Rafsanjani to replace with Gholamhossein Karbaschi. He held the position until 20 August 1997 when he was nominated by Mohammad Khatami as the minister of mines and metals and was confirmed by the Parliament. His portfolio was later changed to the minister of industries and mines and he held that position until President Ahmadinejad's cabinet took over in 2005.
In 2008, it was rumored that Jahangiri would run for a seat in the Parliament but he denied it.

2013 presidential election and vice presidency
Jahangiri was a potential reformist's candidate in the 2013 presidential election but he withdrew in favor of Akbar Hashemi Rafsanjani and then became Rafsanjani's campaign manager. He was a co-founder of Executives of Construction Party and served as its secretary general from 2006 to 2010. He was also a member of Mir-Hossein Mousavi's presidential campaign in the 2009 presidential election. On 23 July 2013, it was reported that Jahangiri would be the next First Vice President and would be appointed by Rouhani after his inauguration. On 29 July, it was confirmed officially, pending his appointment for the post in the inauguration day. He was formally appointed on 4 August by Rouhani as his first vice president, replacing Mohammad Reza Rahimi.

2017 presidential election
In April 2017, it was announced the Jahangiri would register as a candidate for the 2017 Iranian presidential elections. He was successfully vetted and approved by the Guardian Council on 20 April 2017 and officially became a presidential candidate. Many viewed his decision to run for the presidency as a tactical decision to support Rouhani throughout the debates and then withdraw before the voting commenced. He withdrew on 16 May 2017. Later, Hassan Rouhani won the election and Jahangiri was reappointed as first vice president.

COVID-19 outbreak
On 4 March 2020, after the COVID-19 pandemic became known to have spread to Iran, the IranWire website reported that Jahangiri had been infected with SARS-CoV-2, the virus that causes coronavirus disease 2019. However, there was no immediate confirmation from Iranian officials. On 11 March, his infection was confirmed by semi-official Fars News Agency. On 15 March, his office announced that he "tested negative for coronavirus and since he has fully recovered, he returned to his office and resumed his job".

References

External links

1957 births
Living people
Executives of Construction Party politicians
Government ministers of Iran
Candidates for President of Iran
Shahid Bahonar University of Kerman alumni
First vice presidents of Iran
Governors of Isfahan
Members of the 2nd Islamic Consultative Assembly
Members of the 3rd Islamic Consultative Assembly
Iranian industrial engineers
Sharif University of Technology alumni
Islamic Azad University alumni
People from Kerman Province
Iranian campaign managers
People from Sirjan